Nasa auca is a species of plant in the Loasaceae family. It is endemic to Ecuador.  Its natural habitat is subtropical or tropical moist montane forests.

References

Endemic flora of Ecuador
auca
Vulnerable plants
Taxonomy articles created by Polbot